The Acurauá River (  is a river of Acre and Amazonas states in western Brazil. It is a tributary of the Tarauacá River.

Course

The river rises in the west of the state of Acre and runs in a northeast direction.
After being crossed by the BR-364 highway it forms the eastern boundary of the  Rio Gregório State Forest, a sustainable use conservation unit created in 2004.
It then crosses into Amazonas state, where it joins the Tarauacá.

See also
List of rivers of Acre
List of rivers of Amazonas (Brazilian state)

References

Rivers of Acre (state)
Rivers of Amazonas (Brazilian state)